Posca was a popular drink in ancient Rome and Greece

Posca may also refer to:
 Posca (Rome character),  a fictional character in the HBO/BBC television series Rome
 POSCA, a marker pen made by uni-ball
 Jean-Pierre Posca, a French professional footballer